Millerand Island is a high rugged island  in diameter, lying  south of Cape Calmette, off the west coast of Graham Land. It was discovered by the French Antarctic Expedition (1908-1910) under Jean-Baptiste Charcot, who thought that it was a cape of the mainland and named it as such after Alexandre Millerand, French statesman.

17 de Agosto Refuge
Refuge 17 de Agosto  is an Antarctic refuge located in the north east of the Millerand Island in the Marguerite Bay, on the Fallières Coast. It is operated by the Argentine Army and was inaugurated on 17 August 1957. It depends on the San Martín base, which is five kilometres away on the Barry Island.
The refuge consists of a red hut, used by the personnel employed in the missions carried out in the area, and has a capacity to accommodate four people, enough food for two weeks, fuel, gas and first aid kit.

Geology
The island was mapped geologically in 1958 and 1959 by Keith Hoskins, a British geologist based on nearby Stonington Island.

See also 
 List of Antarctic research stations
 List of Antarctic field camps
 List of Antarctic and sub-Antarctic islands
 List of Antarctic islands south of 60° S
 Powell Channel
 SCAR
 Territorial claims in Antarctica
 Composite Antarctic Gazetteer

References

 Hoskins, A.K., 1963. The Basement Complex of Neny Fjord, Graham Land. British Antarctic Survey Scientific reports, No. 43.

External links

Islands of Graham Land
Fallières Coast